Buran bint al-Hasan ibn Sahl (6 December 807 – 21 September 884) also known as Khadija bint al-Hasan ibn Sahl, was one of the wives of the Abbasid caliph Al-Ma'mun.

Buran was al-Ma'mun's second wife, She was the daughter of al-Ma'mun's officer, al-Hasan ibn Sahl. She was born as Khadija. She was born on 6 December 807.

She was the daughter of al-Hasan ibn Sahl, a senior official of al-Ma'mun, and likely named after the Sasanian queen Boran.

She was betrothed to the Caliph at the age of ten. The wedding took place when she was seventeen, in December 825, at Wasit. The wedding was so pompously celebrated that it became proverbial and was called by the name of “The Invitation of Islam”, .
Al-Ma'mun married her in 817, and consummated marriage with her in December 825-January 826 in the town of Fam al-Silh.

Buran entered the Caliph's Harem and became one of three wives of the caliph. Living a secluded life in the harem, only a few things is known about her. She is known to have asked the caliph to pardon uncle Ibrahim ibn al-Mahdi. She also asked him to allow Zubaidah bint Ja'far to go on the Hajj.

She was given the Hasani Palace on the Tigris by her father, and retired to it when she was widowed in 833. She lived there until her death on 21 September 884.

Buran is credited with the creation of the dish burani.

See also
 Umm Isa bint Musa al-Hadi
 Arib al-Ma'muniyya

References

Sources
 
 

884 deaths
Wives of Abbasid caliphs
807 births
9th-century women from the Abbasid Caliphate